Graig Quarry is a limestone quarry that includes a Site of Special Scientific Interest. It is located near Mold in the former county of Clwyd, now Denbighshire, north Wales.

See also
List of Sites of Special Scientific Interest in Clwyd

References

Sites of Special Scientific Interest in Clwyd
Quarries in Wales